José María Sánchez-Verdú (born 1968 in Algeciras) is a Spanish composer.

Sánchez-Verdú graduated in Orchestra Conducting, Musicology and Composition at  Madrid's Royal Conservatory and has a degree in Law from Universidad Complutense. He studied composition in 1992 under Franco Donatoni in Siena. He finished his postgraduate studies under Hans Zender at the Hochschule für Musik und Darstellende Kunst in Frankfurt from 1996 to 1999.

Since October 2001 he lectured on Composition at the Robert-Schumann Musikhochschule in Düsseldorf and since 2008 also at the Conservatorio Superior de Música de Aragon (Zaragoza).

References

External links
Official website

1968 births
Living people
20th-century classical composers
21st-century classical composers
Spanish classical composers
Spanish male classical composers
Madrid Royal Conservatory alumni
Academic staff of the Madrid Royal Conservatory
People from Algeciras
20th-century Spanish musicians
Ernst von Siemens Composers' Prize winners
20th-century Spanish male musicians
21st-century male musicians